Box Design & Build (also known as Box Living), is a design and construction company based in Auckland, New Zealand.

History 
Box was founded in November 2011 by Entrepreneur Dan Heyworth, Architect Tim Dorrington, Builder Nat Jakich and Surveyor Nat Holloway, as a platform of making architecturally designed homes for general public.

The company works on the building model with a post-and-beam exoskeleton with off-site construction and prefabrication, the residential work is based on mid-century modern movement.

A Box home in Hillsborough, Auckland featured on the TV show Grand Designs NZ in 2015.

In 2013 and 2016, the company was awarded New Zealand Institute of Architects award for a project design of a home and post-and-beam design of a multi-unit housing respectively.

In 2018 and 2019, the company won silver and gold awards for projects at the Regional Awards of the Registered Master Builders House of the Year competition.

References

External links
Box website

Companies based in Auckland
Companies established in 2011
Construction and civil engineering companies of New Zealand